This is an award of the Institution of Civil Engineers in memory of James Alfred Ewing made by the Council on the joint nomination of the president and the President of the Royal Society.
It is made to a person, whether a member of the Institution or not, for special meritorious contributions to the science of engineering in the field of research.

Incomplete list of winners

See also

 List of engineering awards

References

Awards of the Institution of Civil Engineers
Awards established in 1937